is a Japanese game producer and designer, known for the Japanese localization of the original Crash Bandicoot and Jak and Daxter series. He works for Sony Computer Entertainment. In Japanese Roppyaku literally means "six hundred."

One of his earliest works in his career is producing and designing the Sega Genesis version of Michael Jackson's Moonwalker.

References

External links 
 Official personal page

Year of birth missing (living people)
Living people
Japanese video game designers
Japanese video game producers